"Aberdeen" is a song by American rock band Cage the Elephant. It is the third single from their second studio album, Thank You, Happy Birthday (2011). The song was originally named Maybelline but was later changed to Aberdeen because Cage the Elephant's lead singer Matt Shultz couldn't stop singing the city's name while rehearsing in Aberdeen, Scotland.

Music video
The music video is a clay animation video and does not feature the band. It is about a clumsy, lonely dragon-like monster who travels to a busy city at night trying to make friends. Instead, he indirectly causes the deaths of 3 people and a dog, much to his shock.  He quickly retreats to his lair and watches the news, where he begins to sob as he finds that the city has demonized him. Throughout the video he is seen creating a replica city. When he returns to the city, he holds a statue he made of himself and another human holding hands, with "FRIENDS" engraved on the bottom. As he walks through the city a second time, police shine a spotlight in his eyes, causing him to drop the statue. When the police inspect the statue, which is now broken, they see the monster trying to eat a person and the engraving of "FRIENDS" is smashed and says "DIE". Subsequently the police officers open fire on the dragon, and the dragon kicks one of them.

Once again he hurries back to his lair, to later be intruded upon by soldiers and a tank. All of the soldiers open fire on the dragon with automatic weapons, and one fires consecutive rockets at him, causing the beast to lose an arm and leg.  The tank then fires a shell directly at his head, causing it to explode.  One of the monster's eyes rolls over toward the General, prompting him to casually shoot the eye.  With the beast subdued, the General lights a cigar and walks over to a statue of the creature and a human smiling together, and a look of surprise washes over him as he realizes that the dragon wanted to be friends.

Track listing
Track written by Cage the Elephant.

Charts

Weekly charts

Year-end charts

References

2011 singles
Cage the Elephant songs
Song recordings produced by Jay Joyce
2011 songs
Jive Records singles
Songs written by Matt Shultz (singer)